Arthur Lewis Tubbs (1867–1946) was an American drama and music critic who worked for the Philadelphia Evening Bulletin for almost 40 years.

He wrote plays and poems, under the name Arthur Sylvester.  He also wrote hymns.

Bibliography

 The Finger of Scorn
 The Village Lawyer
 The country doctor
 Cranberry Corners
 Alias Miss Sherlock

Hymns
 For a moment in the morning
 It is just a step to Jesus

References

External links

 

American music critics
American dramatists and playwrights
American male poets
1867 births
1946 deaths